The National Security Council was a military junta established to exercise legislative authority after the seizure of the country's government by the 1980 Turkish coup d'état. It consisted of Chief of General Staff General Kenan Evren, Commander of the Land Forces General Nurettin Ersin,  Commander of the Naval Forces Admiral Nejat Tümer, Commander of the Air Force General Tahsin Şahinkaya, and  Commander of the Gendarmerie General Sedat Celasun. 

On November 7, 1982, in the 1982 Turkish constitutional referendum held in Turkey, the Constitution was approved with 91.37% of the votes and Kenan Evren was elected president for seven years in accordance with the provisional first article of the Constitution. The National Security Council ceased to exist on December 7, 1983, when the Presidency Council of the Grand National Assembly of Turkey was formed following the general elections held on November 6, 1983. Pursuant to the second provisional article of the Constitution, the members of the National Security Council became members of the Presidential Council for six years.

Members

References 

1980 in Turkey
1981 in Turkey
1982 in Turkey
1983 in Turkey
Organizations established in 1980
1980 establishments in Turkey
1983 disestablishments in Turkey